Isaac of the Cells was an Egyptian Christian monk who lived during the 4th and 5th centuries in Nitria, Lower Egypt. He was one of the Desert Fathers.

He was a disciple of Cronius of Nitria and succeeded him in 395. However, later Archbishop Theophilus excommunicated him as an Origenist along with the Four Tall Brothers.

See also
First Origenist Crisis

References

4th-century births
5th-century deaths
Egyptian Christian monks
Desert Fathers